Events from the year 1582 in India.

Events
 Mosque established at Rohinkhed
 Hazira Maqbara mausoleum constructed in Vadodara
 Maharana Pratap defeats Mughal Forces of Akbar in Battle of Dewair in present day Rajasthan

Births

Deaths
 Bega Begum empress of the Mughal Empire dies (born 1511)

See also

 Timeline of Indian history

References